Surf Excel is a Unilever brand that is currently as the counterpart brand of OMO detergent in the India, Pakistan, Bangladesh and Sri Lanka markets.

References

External links
 Surf Excel - India
 Surf Excel - Sri Lanka

Products introduced in 1948
Laundry detergents
Unilever brands

fr:OMO (marque)
nl:Omo (wasmiddel)